is C-ute's 12th single, released on April 28, 2010 on the Zetima label.

The single was released in two editions: Regular Edition and Limited Edition, the latter with a DVD. The first press contained an event ticket draw card with a serial number. The Single V appeared on May 12.

Track listing

CD single

Single V

Event V

Charts

Sales and certifications

References

External links 
 Review: Campus Life (Umarete Kite Yokatta) / Cute - Hotexpress
 C-ute・矢島舞美が初舞台に挑戦、意気込みを語る
 
 
 キャンパスライフ～生まれて来てよかった～ Cute's official blog

2010 singles
Japanese-language songs
Cute (Japanese idol group) songs
Songs written by Tsunku
Song recordings produced by Tsunku
Zetima Records singles
2010 songs